The Setanta Sports Cup Final 2007 took place at Windsor Park, Belfast on Saturday 12 May 2007 between Linfield and Drogheda United. It was the third Setanta Cup Final and the first to be played in Northern Ireland.

Match details

Trivia
The two teams competing in the final, Linfield and Drogheda United, are the only teams to have won the competition previously.
This was the first final played in Northern Ireland. The two previous finals were held in Tolka Park, Dublin.
Linfield and Drogheda United have previously met three times in the history of the Setanta Cup. Each side has a win each; the other match was a draw.
Drogheda United have won the Setanta Cup each time they have qualified for it.

See also
Setanta Sports Cup 2007

External links
 Official Setanta Cup Site

Setanta Sports Cup Final
Setanta Sports Cup Final
2007
Setanta Sports Cup Final 2007
Setanta Sports Cup Final 2007